The Japan Record Award for the Best Album ("最優秀アルバム賞") is awarded annually, but was suspended in 2006, 2007, 2020 to 2022. The top honor for albums was named the Album Grand Prix Award ("アルバム大賞") until 2001, when it was replaced by the Best Album award ("ベストアルバム賞"), and underwent another Japanese name change in 2008.

1980s

1990s

2000s

2010s

2020s 
Due to the COVID-19 pandemic, the Best Album award was not presented from 2020 to 2022.

References

External links 
 Japan Composer's Association

Japanese music awards
Album awards